Bubbling Over is a 1934 American musical comedy short film directed by Leigh Jason. The film includes various negative stereotypes. It is extant.

Plot
Samson Peabody is the janitor in an apartment building where he and his wife Ethel live with a large crowd of Samson's freeloading relatives.  When more relatives come to stay, Ethel throws them out.  A scheming occupant of the building reads Samson's mail and poses as a clairvoyant predicting the events of the letter; the arrival of Samson's rich Uncle for dinner.  However, the Uncle is a penniless lunatic (imagining himself to be The Emperor Jones) and a pickpocket.  He steals the chicken dinner, several watches of the guests, the clairvoyant's crystal ball, and (in the final scene) all the clothes of the people in the room.

Cast
Ethel Waters as Ethel Peabody
Southernaires Quartet as Some Relatives
Hamtree Harrington as Presbee Peabody
Frank L. Wilson as Swami River

Soundtrack
 Ethel Waters - "Taking Your Time"
 Southernaires Quartet - "Hang Your Hat in a Harlem Flat"
 Ethel Waters - "Darkies Never Dream"
 Southernaires Quartet - "Company's Coming Tonight"

References

External links

Film at Daily Motion

1934 films
1934 musical comedy films
American musical comedy films
American black-and-white films
RKO Pictures short films
Films directed by Leigh Jason
Race films
1930s English-language films
1930s American films